Baker Boyer National Bank is a Walla Walla, Washington based financial institution. It opened in 1869, making it the first bank in what would become the State of Washington.

It was the first Walla Walla bank to open a branch office. Bank CEO Mark Kajita is the third non-family President and CEO of the organization and was preceded by Baker Boyer's Board Chairman, Megan Clubb, a descendant of bank founder Dorsey S. Baker.

In 2010, the bank closed its branch in Weston, Oregon.

The bank building in Walla Walla, built , was designed by the Beezer Brothers architectural office in Seattle. It is a seven-story office building with a colonnade of Ionic columns spanning the lower two floors at the front. This building was the first skyscraper in Walla Walla.

References 

Banks based in Washington (state)
Banks established in 1869
Walla Walla, Washington
1869 establishments in Washington Territory
Companies based in Walla Walla County, Washington